Ardel is an unincorporated community located in Wayne County, West Virginia, United States.

References 

Unincorporated communities in West Virginia

Unincorporated communities in Wayne County, West Virginia